Syed Manzoor ul Hassan Hashmi (31 March 1936 – 20 December 2000) was squadron leader in the Pakistan Air Force. He served in the 1965 and 1971 wars. He was a recipient of the Sitara-e-Jurat.

Career 
Hashmi joined the RPAF College, Risalpur in October 1954. He completed his fighter training at Mauripur, he joined the No 15 squadron. He later served in the No 11 and No 9 squadrons as well.

Starting his career as Flight Lieutenant, Hashmi flew 20 strike and 2 air defence missions against the enemy. His strikes were directed against enemy concentrations on Jummu, Sialkot, Wagha-Kasur sectors. He led his mission in a most competent manner and achieved considerable success against heavily defended enemy areas. His own aircraft was hit on six occasions by Ack Ack and small arms fire but, undaunted, he pursued his attacks on the enemy. His formation achieved notable success on 21 September 1965, in which he destroyed many heavy guns of the enemy which were shelling Lahore and earned him deep appreciation on own army's Area Commander. His cool, courageous and operational leadership in complete disregard to his own safety in the face of heavy enemy fire and devotion to duty are commendable. Hashmi was awarded Sitara-i-Juraat.

Death 
Hashmi died on 20 December 2000 fue to a heart attack. He was laid to rest in his native town in Jhelum District.

Gallery

Awards and decorations

See also
Sarfaraz Ahmed Rafiqui

References

1936 births
2000 deaths
Pakistan Air Force officers
Pakistani prisoners and detainees
People from Jhelum District
Pilots of the Indo-Pakistani War of 1965